Guy Gorham Holmes (1 December 1905 – 22 November 1967) was an English footballer who represented Great Britain at the 1936 Summer Olympics. Holmes played amateur football for Ilford.

References

1905 births
1967 deaths
English footballers
Ilford F.C. players
Footballers at the 1936 Summer Olympics
Olympic footballers of Great Britain
Association football defenders